This is a list of award winners and league leaders for the Detroit Tigers professional baseball team.

Awards and achievements

American League Most Valuable Player Award (12)

1911 – Ty Cobb
1934 – Mickey Cochrane
1935 – Hank Greenberg
1937 – Charlie Gehringer
1940 – Hank Greenberg
1944 – Hal Newhouser
1945 – Hal Newhouser
1968 – Denny McLain
1984 – Willie Hernández
2011 – Justin Verlander
2012 – Miguel Cabrera
2013 – Miguel Cabrera

American League Cy Young Award (5)

1968 – Denny McLain
1969 – Denny McLain
1984 – Willie Hernández
2011 – Justin Verlander
2013 – Max Scherzer

American League Triple Crown (4)

1909 – Ty Cobb, batting
1945 – Hal Newhouser, pitching
2011 – Justin Verlander, pitching
2012 – Miguel Cabrera, batting

American League Rookie of the Year award (5)

1953 – Harvey Kuenn
1976 – Mark Fidrych
1978 – Lou Whitaker
2006 – Justin Verlander
2016 – Michael Fulmer

American League Manager of the Year (3)

See footnote
1984 – Sparky Anderson
1987 – Sparky Anderson
2006 – Jim Leyland

Fielding Bible Award (2)

Gold Glove Award (43)

Silver Slugger Award (33)

Edgar Martínez Award

1975 – Willie Horton
1978 – Rusty Staub
2014 – Víctor Martínez

Wilson Defensive Player of the Year Award (3)

Team (at all positions)
2012 – Austin Jackson
2013 – Austin Jackson

Second base (in MLB)
2014 – Ian Kinsler

American League Championship Series MVP Award (3)

1984 – Kirk Gibson
2006 – Plácido Polanco
2012 – Delmon Young

World Series MVP Award (2)

1968 – Mickey Lolich
1984 – Alan Trammell

MLB "This Year in Baseball Awards"
See: This Year in Baseball Awards#Award winners
Note: Voted by fans as the best in all of Major League Baseball (i.e., not two awards, one for each league).

"This Year in Baseball Awards" MLB MVP
2012 – Miguel Cabrera
2013 – Miguel Cabrera

"This Year in Baseball Awards" Defensive Player of the Year
2007 – Plácido Polanco

"This Year in Baseball Awards" Play of the Year
2007 – Curtis Granderson

"This Year in Baseball Awards" Performance of the Year
2010 – Armando Galarraga

"Greatness in Baseball Yearly (GIBBY)" Starting Pitcher
2011 – Justin Verlander

"Greatness in Baseball Yearly (GIBBY)" Closer
2011 – José Valverde

Players Choice Awards

Player of the Year
2011 – Justin Verlander
2012 – Miguel Cabrera
2013 – Miguel Cabrera (2)

Marvin Miller Man of the Year Award

2009 – Curtis Granderson
2010 – Brandon Inge

Outstanding Player
2012 – Miguel Cabrera
2013 – Miguel Cabrera (2)

Outstanding Pitcher
2011 – Justin Verlander
2013 – Max Scherzer

Outstanding Rookie
2006 – Justin Verlander
2010 – Austin Jackson
2016 – Michael Fulmer

MLB All-Century Team
See: Major League Baseball All-Century Team
Ty Cobb (1 of 10 outfielders)

MLB All-Time Team (BBWAA)
See: Major League Baseball All-Time Team
Ty Cobb (CF; runner-up)

DHL Hometown Heroes (2006)

Ty Cobb — voted by MLB fans as the most outstanding player in the history of the franchise, based on on-field performance, leadership quality and character value

USA Today AL MVP
2011 – Miguel Cabrera

USA Today AL Top Pitcher 
2011 – Justin Verlander

American League Rolaids Relief Man Award

See footnote
2000 – Todd Jones
2011 – José Valverde

Sporting News AL Reliever of the Year Award

See footnote

The Sporting News AL Fireman of the Year Award (1960–2000; for closers)
 1973 – John Hiller
 2000 – Todd Jones

Sporting News AL Reliever of the Year Award (2001–present; for all relievers)

Sporting News AL Rookie of the Year Award

 2016 – Michael Fulmer

Topps All-Star Rookie teams

 1961 – Jake Wood (2B)
 1970 – Les Cain (LHP)
 1975 – Tom Veryzer (SS)
 1976 – Jason Thompson (1B) & Mark Fidrych (RHP)
 1977 – Dave Rozema (RHP)
 1980 – Rick Peters (OF)
 1987 – Matt Nokes (C)
 1988 – Paul Gibson (LHP)
 1991 – Milt Cuyler (OF) & Mark Leiter (LHP)
 1992 – Scott Livingstone (3B)
 1994 – Chris Gomez (SS)
 1996 – Tony Clark (1B)
 2002 – Ramon Santiago (SS)
 2006 – Justin Verlander (RHP)
 2010 – Austin Jackson (OF)
 2013 – José Iglesias (SS)

Sporting News American League Comeback Player of the Year 

 1965 – Norm Cash
 1971 – Norm Cash
 1973 – John Hiller
 1983 – Alan Trammell

Hutch Award 

 1969 – Al Kaline
 1973 – John Hiller

Ford C. Frick Award (broadcasters)

 1981 – Ernie Harwell

BBWAA Career Excellence Award (baseball writers)

 1968 – H. G. Salsinger
 2001 – Joe Falls
 2015 – Tom Gage
 2022 – John Lowe

Team award
 
 – American League pennant
 – American League pennant
 – American League pennant
 – American League pennant
 – American League pennant
 – World Series championship
 – American League pennant
 – American League pennant
 – World Series championship
 – American League pennant
 – World Series Trophy
1984 – William Harridge Trophy (American League champion)
 – World Series Trophy
 – Baseball America Organization of the Year
2006 – William Harridge Trophy (American League champion)
2012 – William Harridge Trophy (American League champion)
2013 – Commissioner's Award for Philanthropic Excellence

Team records (single-game, single-season, career)

Minor-league system

USA Today Minor League Player of the Year Award

 1998 – Gabe Kapler (OF)

Other achievements

National Baseball Hall of Fame
See: Detroit Tigers#Baseball Hall of Famers

Retired numbers
See: Detroit Tigers#Retired numbers and honorees

Tiger of the Year
The following players were selected as "Tiger of the Year" by the Detroit chapter of the Baseball Writers' Association of America.

2022 – Riley Greene: .253 batting average; 18 doubles; 5 home runs; 52 RBIs; .707 OPS
2021 – Jeimer Candelario: .271 batting average; 42 doubles (T-1st in MLB); 16 home runs; 67 RBIs; .795 OPS
2020 – Jeimer Candelario: .297 batting average; 3 triples (T-2nd in AL); 7 home runs; 29 RBIs; .872 OPS
2019 – Matthew Boyd: 9-12 record; 4.56 ERA; 238 strikeouts (6th in AL); 7.46 K/BB ratio (4th in AL) ;1.23 WHIP (9th in AL)
2018 - Nicholas Castellanos: .298 batting average; 23 home runs; 46 doubles; 89 RBIs; .854 OPS; .500 slugging
2017 – Justin Upton: .279 batting average; 28 home runs; 37 doubles; 94 RBIs; .904 OPS; .542 slugging
2016 – Justin Verlander: 16–9 record; 3.04 ERA (2nd in AL); Led AL with 254 strikeouts and 1.00 WHIP; 6.61 WAR (1st in AL among pitchers)
2015 – J. D. Martinez: .282 batting average; 33 doubles; 38 home runs (8th in AL); 102 RBIs (7th in AL); .879 OPS (9th in AL); .993 fielding percentage; 15 outfield assists (2nd in AL)
2014 – Víctor Martínez: .335 batting average (2nd in AL); 103 RBIs; .409 on-base percentage (1st in AL); .974 OPS (1st in MLB)
2013 – Miguel Cabrera: AL MVP; .348 batting average (1st in MLB); 44 home runs (2nd in MLB); 137 RBIs (2nd in MLB)
2012 – Miguel Cabrera: AL MVP; Triple Crown winner; .330 batting average (1st in MLB); 44 home runs (1st in MLB); 139 RBIs (1st in MLB)
2011 – Justin Verlander: AL MVP; Triple Crown winner; 24–5 record; 2.40 ERA
2010 – Miguel Cabrera: .328 batting average; 38 home runs; 45 doubles; 126 RBIs; .622 slugging
2009 – Justin Verlander: 19–9 record; 3.45 ERA; Led AL with 35 games started, 240.0 innings pitched, 269 strikeouts and 10.1 strikeouts per nine innings.
2008 – Miguel Cabrera: .292 batting average; 37 home runs (1st in AL); 36 doubles; 127 RBIs (3rd in AL); .537 slugging (7th in AL)
2007 – Magglio Ordóñez: .363 average (led Major League Baseball); 54 doubles (led MLB); 139 RBIs (2nd in American League), .434 on base (2nd in AL), .595 slugging (4th in AL)
2006 – Carlos Guillén: .320 average; .400 on base; .519 slugging; 41 doubles; 100 runs; No. 10 in AL MVP voting
2005 – Plácido Polanco: 338 average and .461 slugging in 86 games
2004 – Iván Rodríguez: Gold Glove at catcher; .334 average; .510 slugging; 33 doubles; No. 10 in AL MVP voting
2003 – Dmitri Young: 29 home runs; .297 average; .372 on base; .537 slugging
2002 – Randall Simon: 19 home runs; .301 average
2001 – Steve Sparks: Led AL in complete games (8)
2000 – Bobby Higginson: .300 average; .538 slugging; 40 doubles; 30 home runs; 102 RBIs; 104 runs; 19 OF assists
1999 – Dean Palmer: 38 home runs; 100 RBIs; .518 slugging
1998 – Damion Easley: 38 doubles; 27 home runs; 100 RBIs
1997 – Tony Clark: 32 home runs; 117 RBIs; 105 runs; .500 slugging
1997 – Bobby Higginson: .299 average; .379 on base; .520 slugging; 27 home runs; 20 OF assists
1996 – Travis Fryman: 22 home runs; 100 RBIs
1995 – Travis Fryman: .275 average; 81 RBIs
1994 – Kirk Gibson: 23 home runs; .548 slugging
1993 – Tony Phillips: .313 average; .443 on base; 113 runs
1992 – Cecil Fielder: 35 home runs; 124 RBIs; No. 9 in AL MVP voting
1991 – Cecil Fielder: 44 home runs: 133 RBIs; 102 runs; No. 2 in AL MVP voting
1990 – Cecil Fielder: 51 home runs; 132 RBIs; 104 runs; .592 slugging; No. 2 in AL MVP voting
1989 – Lou Whitaker: 28 home runs; .361 on base pct; .462 slugging
1988 – Alan Trammell: .311 average; No. 7 in AL MVP voting
1987 – Alan Trammell: .343 average; .402 on base; .551 slugging; 28 home runs; 105 RBIs; No. 2 in AL MVP voting
1986 – Jack Morris: 21–8 record; .724 win percentage; No. 5 in AL Cy Young voting
1985 – Darrell Evans: AL HR leader at age 38 with 40 HRs; .518 slugging; No. 14 in AL MVP voting
1984 – Willie Hernández: AL MVP and Cy Young Awards; 1.92 ERA; 68 games finished
1983 – Lou Whitaker: Gold Glove at 2nd base; .320 average; 205 hits; No. 8 in AL MVP voting
1982 – Lance Parrish: 32 home runs; .529 slugging; No. 13 in AL MVP voting
1981 – Kirk Gibson: .328 average; No. 12 in AL MVP voting
1980 – Alan Trammell: Gold Glove at shortstop; .300 average; .376 on base pct.
1979 – Steve Kemp: 318 average; .543 slugging; 26 home runs; 105 RBIs
1978 – Ron LeFlore: Led AL in stolen bases (68) and runs (126)
1977 – Ron LeFlore: .325 average; 212 hits; 100 runs
1976 – Mark Fidrych: Year of the Bird; 19 wins; 2.34 ERA; Rookie of the Year Award; No. 2 in AL Cy Young voting
1975 – Willie Horton: 25 home runs; 92 RBIs
1974 – Al Kaline: Kaline's final season; 3,000th hit
1973 – John Hiller: 1.44 ERA; 65 games; No. 4 in AL MVP voting; AL Hutch Award
1972 – Ed Brinkman: Gold Glove award at shortstop; .990 fielding percentage; No. 9 in AL MVP and CY Young voting
1971 – Mickey Lolich: Led AL in wins (25) and strikeouts (308); No. 2 in Cy Young voting; No. 5 in AL MVP voting
1970 – Tom Timmermann: 61 games; 43 games finished; 27 saves
1969 – Denny McLain: 24 wins; 2.80 ERA; .727 win percentage
1968 – Denny McLain: 31 wins; 1.96 ERA; .280 strikeouts; 838 win pct.; Cy Young and AL MVP awards
1967 – Bill Freehan: Gold Glove award at catcher; .389 on-base percentage; No. 3 in AL MVP voting
1966 – Denny McLain: 20 wins; .727 win percentage; No. 15 in AL MVP voting
1965 – Don Wert: .341 on-base percentage; 331 assists at third base; No. 10 in AL MVP voting

King Tiger Award
See: King Tiger Award

Sporting News Sportsman of the YearSee: Sporting News#Sportsman of the Year''
 1968 – Denny McLain

Michigan Sports Hall of Fame

American League statistical batting leaders

Batting average (27)

 1907 – Ty Cobb, .350
 1908 – Ty Cobb, .324
 1909 – Ty Cobb, .377
 1911 – Ty Cobb, .420
 1912 – Ty Cobb, .409
 1913 – Ty Cobb, .390
 1914 – Ty Cobb, .368
 1915 – Ty Cobb, .369
 1917 – Ty Cobb, .383

 1918 – Ty Cobb, .382
 1919 – Ty Cobb, .384
 1921 – Harry Heilmann, .394
 1923 – Harry Heilmann, .403
 1925 – Harry Heilmann, .393
 1926 – Heinie Manush, .378
 1927 – Harry Heilmann, .398
 1932 – Dale Alexander, .367
 1937 – Charlie Gehringer, .371

 1949 – George Kell, .343
 1955 – Al Kaline, .340
 1959 – Harvey Kuenn, .353
 1961 – Norm Cash, .361
 2007 – Magglio Ordóñez, .363
 2011 – Miguel Cabrera, .344
 2012 – Miguel Cabrera, .340
 2013 – Miguel Cabrera, .348
 2015 – Miguel Cabrera, .338

On-base percentage (15)

1903 – Jimmy Barrett, .407
1909 – Ty Cobb, .431
1910 – Ty Cobb, .456
1913 – Ty Cobb, .467
1914 – Ty Cobb, .466

1915 – Ty Cobb, .486
1917 – Ty Cobb, .444
1918 – Ty Cobb, .440
1959 – Eddie Yost, .435
1960 – Eddie Yost, .414

1961 – Norm Cash, .487
2010 – Miguel Cabrera, .420
2011 – Miguel Cabrera, .448
2013 – Miguel Cabrera, .442
2014 – Víctor Martínez, .409

Slugging percentage (14)

1907 – Ty Cobb, .468
1908 – Ty Cobb, .475
1909 – Ty Cobb, .517
1910 – Ty Cobb, .551
1911 – Ty Cobb, .621

1912 – Ty Cobb, .584
1914 – Ty Cobb, .513
1917 – Ty Cobb, .570
1940 – Hank Greenberg, .670
1943 – Rudy York, .527

1959 – Al Kaline, .530
1990 – Cecil Fielder, .592
2012 – Miguel Cabrera, .606
2013 – Miguel Cabrera, .636

On-base plus slugging (OPS) (16)

1907 – Ty Cobb, .848
1908 – Ty Cobb, .842
1909 – Ty Cobb, .947
1910 – Ty Cobb, 1.008
1911 – Ty Cobb, 1.088
1912 – Ty Cobb, 1.040

1914 – Ty Cobb, .979
1915 – Ty Cobb, .973
1917 – Ty Cobb, 1.014
1925 – Ty Cobb, 1.066
1940 – Hank Greenberg, 1.103
1959 – Al Kaline, .940

1961 – Norm Cash, 1.148
2012 – Miguel Cabrera, .999
2013 – Miguel Cabrera, 1.078
2014 – Víctor Martínez, .974

Games played (40)

1904 – Jimmy Barrett, 162
1909 – Donie Bush, 157
1920 – Bobby Veach, 154
1922 – Topper Rigney, 155
1922 – Bobby Veach, 155
1926 – Jackie Tavener, 156
1929 – Dale Alexander, 155
1930 – Charlie Gehringer, 155
1930 – Dale Alexander, 154
1930 – Charlie Gehringer, 154
1933 – Charlie Gehringer, 155
1933 – Billy Rogell, 155
1934 – Charlie Gehringer, 154
1934 – Marv Owen, 154

1934 – Billy Rogell, 154
1940 – Rudy York, 155
1943 – Dick Wakefield, 155
1943 – Rudy York, 155
1945 – Rudy York, 155
1946 – Eddie Lake, 155
1947 – Eddie Lake, 158
1949 – Vic Wertz, 155
1950 – Johnny Groth, 157
1950 – George Kell, 157
1950 – Jerry Priddy, 157
1951 – Jerry Priddy, 154
1954 – Harvey Kuenn, 155
1955 – Bill Tuttle, 154

1961 – Rocky Colavito, 163
1965 – Don Wert, 162
1972 – Ed Brinkman, 162
1973 – Ed Brinkman, 162
1976 – Rusty Staub, 161
1981 – Lou Whitaker, 109
1991 – Cecil Fielder, 162
1997 – Brian Hunter, 162
2009 – Brandon Inge, 161
2011 – Miguel Cabrera, 161
2012 – Prince Fielder, 162
2013 – Prince Fielder, 162

At bats (12)

1908 – Sam Crawford, 591
1913 – Sam Crawford, 609
1917 – Ty Cobb, 588
1929 – Roy Johnson, 640

1942 – Doc Cramer, 630
1943 – Dick Wakefield, 633
1950 – George Kell, 641
1953 – Harvey Kuenn, 679

1954 – Harvey Kuenn, 656
1992 – Travis Fryman, 659
1994 – Travis Fryman, 464
2014 – Ian Kinsler, 684

Plate appearances (17)

1904 – Jimmy Barrett, 714
1908 – Matty McIntyre, 672
1909 – Donie Bush, 676
1913 – Donie Bush, 694
1914 – Donie Bush, 721
1915 – Donie Bush, 703

1918 – Donie Bush, 594
1922 – Bobby Veach, 705
1929 – Charlie Gehringer, 717
1943 – Dick Wakefield, 697
1946 – Eddie Lake, 703
1953 – Harvey Kuenn, 731

1963 – Rocky Colavito, 692
1994 – Tony Phillips, 538
1995 – Chad Curtis, 670
2014 – Ian Kinsler, 726

Runs (15)

1907 – Sam Crawford, 102
1908 – Matty McIntyre, 105
1909 – Ty Cobb, 116
1910 – Ty Cobb, 106
1911 – Ty Cobb, 147

1915 – Ty Cobb, 144
1916 – Ty Cobb, 113
1917 – Donie Bush, 112
1929 – Charlie Gehringer, 131
1934 – Charlie Gehringer, 134

1938 – Hank Greenberg, 143
1959 – Eddie Yost, 115
1968 – Dick McAuliffe, 95
1978 – Ron LeFlore, 126
1992 – Tony Phillips, 114

Hits (23)

1907 – Ty Cobb, 212
1908 – Ty Cobb, 188
1909 – Ty Cobb, 216
1911 – Ty Cobb, 248
1912 – Ty Cobb, 226
1915 – Ty Cobb, 208
1917 – Ty Cobb, 225
1919 – Ty Cobb, 191

1919 – Bobby Veach, 191
1921 – Harry Heilmann, 237
1929 – Dale Alexander, 215
1929 – Charlie Gehringer, 215
1934 – Charlie Gehringer, 214
1940 – Barney McCosky, 200
1943 – Dick Wakefield, 200
1950 – George Kell, 218

1951 – George Kell, 191
1953 – Harvey Kuenn, 209
1954 – Harvey Kuenn, 201
1955 – Al Kaline, 200
1956 – Harvey Kuenn, 196
1959 – Harvey Kuenn, 198
1961 – Norm Cash, 193

Total bases (15)

1907 – Ty Cobb, 283
1908 – Ty Cobb, 276
1909 – Ty Cobb, 296
1911 – Ty Cobb, 367
1913 – Sam Crawford, 298

1915 – Ty Cobb, 274
1917 – Ty Cobb, 335
1935 – Hank Greenberg, 389
1940 – Hank Greenberg, 384
1943 – Rudy York, 301

1955 – Al Kaline, 321
1962 – Rocky Colavito, 309
1990 – Cecil Fielder, 339
2008 – Miguel Cabrera, 331
2012 – Miguel Cabrera, 377

Singles (12)

1907 – Ty Cobb, 165
1908 – Matty McIntyre, 131
1909 – Ty Cobb, 164
1911 – Ty Cobb, 169

1912 – Ty Cobb, 166
1915 – Ty Cobb, 161
1917 – Ty Cobb, 151
1931 – John Stone, 142

1943 – Doc Cramer, 159
1951 – George Kell, 150
1953 – Harvey Kuenn, 167
1978 – Ron LeFlore, 153

Doubles (23)

1908 – Ty Cobb, 36
1909 – Sam Crawford, 35
1911 – Ty Cobb, 47
1915 – Bobby Veach, 40
1917 – Ty Cobb, 44
1919 – Bobby Veach, 45
1924 – Harry Heilmann, 45
1929 – Charlie Gehringer, 45

1929 – Roy Johnson, 45
1934 – Hank Greenberg, 63
1936 – Charlie Gehringer, 60
1940 – Hank Greenberg, 50
1943 – Dick Wakefield, 38
1950 – George Kell, 56
1951 – George Kell, 36
1955 – Harvey Kuenn, 38

1958 – Harvey Kuenn, 39
1959 – Harvey Kuenn, 42
1961 – Al Kaline, 41
2007 – Magglio Ordóñez, 54
2011 – Miguel Cabrera, 48
2014 – Miguel Cabrera, 52
2021 – Jeimer Candelario, 42

Triples (19)

1903 – Sam Crawford, 25
1908 – Ty Cobb, 20
1910 – Sam Crawford, 19
1911 – Ty Cobb, 24
1913 – Sam Crawford, 23
1914 – Sam Crawford, 26
1915 – Sam Crawford, 19

1917 – Ty Cobb, 24
1918 – Ty Cobb, 14
1919 – Bobby Veach, 17
1929 – Charlie Gehringer, 19
1931 – Roy Johnson, 19
1940 – Barney McCosky, 19
1950 – Hoot Evers, 11

1961 – Jake Wood, 14
2007 – Curtis Granderson, 23
2008 – Curtis Granderson, 12
2012 – Austin Jackson, 10
2017 – Nicholas Castellanos, 10

Home runs (12)

1908 – Sam Crawford, 7
1909 – Ty Cobb, 9
1935 – Hank Greenberg, 36
1938 – Hank Greenberg, 58

1940 – Hank Greenberg, 41
1943 – Rudy York, 34
1946 – Hank Greenberg, 44
1985 – Darrell Evans, 40

1990 – Cecil Fielder, 51
1991 – Cecil Fielder, 44
2008 – Miguel Cabrera, 37
2012 – Miguel Cabrera, 44

Runs batted in (21)

1907 – Ty Cobb, 119
1908 – Ty Cobb, 108
1909 – Ty Cobb, 107
1910 – Sam Crawford, 120
1911 – Ty Cobb, 127
1914 – Sam Crawford, 104
1915 – Sam Crawford, 112

1915 – Bobby Veach, 112
1917 – Bobby Veach, 103
1918 – Bobby Veach, 78
1935 – Hank Greenberg, 170
1937 – Hank Greenberg, 183
1940 – Hank Greenberg, 150
1943 – Rudy York, 118

1946 – Hank Greenberg, 127
1955 – Ray Boone, 116
1990 – Cecil Fielder, 132
1991 – Cecil Fielder, 133
1992 – Cecil Fielder, 124
2010 – Miguel Cabrera, 126
2012 – Miguel Cabrera, 139

Walks (12)

1903 – Jimmy Barrett, 74
1904 – Jimmy Barrett, 79
1909 – Donie Bush, 88
1910 – Donie Bush, 78

1911 – Donie Bush, 98
1912 – Donie Bush, 117
1914 – Donie Bush, 112
1938 – Hank Greenberg, 119

1959 – Eddie Yost, 135
1960 – Eddie Yost, 125
1992 – Mickey Tettleton, 122
1993 – Tony Phillips, 132

Strikeouts (8)

1901 – Jimmy Barrett, 64
1939 – Hank Greenberg, 95
1961 – Jake Wood, 141

1990 – Cecil Fielder, 182
1991 – Rob Deer, 175
1994 – Travis Fryman, 128

2006 – Curtis Granderson, 174
2010 – Austin Jackson, 170

Stolen bases (10)

1907 – Ty Cobb, 53
1909 – Ty Cobb, 76
1911 – Ty Cobb, 83
1915 – Ty Cobb, 96

1916 – Ty Cobb, 68
1917 – Ty Cobb, 55
1929 – Charlie Gehringer, 27
1930 – Marty McManus, 23

1978 – Ron LeFlore, 68
1997 – Brian Hunter, 74

Runs created (20)

1903 – Sam Crawford, 98
1907 – Ty Cobb, 106
1908 – Ty Cobb, 100
1909 – Ty Cobb, 126
1911 – Ty Cobb, 169
1915 – Ty Cobb, 138
1916 – Ty Cobb, 125

1917 – Ty Cobb, 148
1918 – Ty Cobb, 95
1935 – Hank Greenberg, 159
1937 – Hank Greenberg, 172
1940 – Hank Greenberg, 166
1943 – Rudy York, 109
1950 – George Kell, 124

1959 – Harvey Kuenn, 117
1961 – Norm Cash, 178
2010 – Miguel Cabrera, 141
2011 – Miguel Cabrera, 149
2012 – Miguel Cabrera, 139
2013 – Miguel Cabrera, 155

Extra-base hits (14)

1907 – Sam Crawford, 55
1908 – Ty Cobb, 60
1909 – Sam Crawford, 55
1911 – Ty Cobb, 79
1913 – Sam Crawford, 64

1915 – Sam Crawford, 54
1917 – Ty Cobb, 74
1934 – Hank Greenberg, 96
1935 – Hank Greenberg, 98
1937 – Hank Greenberg, 103

1940 – Hank Greenberg, 99
1943 – Rudy York, 67
1990 – Cecil Fielder, 77
2012 – Miguel Cabrera, 84

Times on base (14)

1903 – Jimmy Barrett, 243
1904 – Jimmy Barrett, 249
1908 – Matty McIntyre, 258
1909 – Ty Cobb, 270
1911 – Ty Cobb, 300

1915 – Ty Cobb, 336
1917 – Ty Cobb, 290
1925 – Harry Heilmann, 293
1959 – Eddie Yost, 292
1960 – Eddie Yost, 262

1961 – Norm Cash, 326
2010 – Miguel Cabrera, 272
2011 – Miguel Cabrera, 308
2012 – Prince Fielder, 284

Hit by pitch (13)

1902 – Dick Harley, 12
1914 – George Burns, 12
1917 – Tubby Spencer, 9
1917 – Bobby Veach, 9
1923 – Heinie Manush, 17

1924 – Heinie Manush, 16
1962 – Norm Cash, 13
1967 – Bill Freehan, 20
1968 – Bill Freehan, 24
1982 – Chet Lemon, 15

1983 – Chet Lemon, 20
2012 – Prince Fielder, 17

Sacrifice hits (14)

1901 – Kid Nance
1903 – Billy Lush
1909 – Donie Bush
1915 – Ossie Vitt
1920 – Donie Bush

1943 – Joe Hoover
1944 – Eddie Mayo
1958 – Billy Martin
1968 – Denny McLain
1969 – Denny McLain

1981 – Alan Trammell
1983 – Alan Trammell
2003 – Ramón Santiago
2009 – Adam Everett

Sacrifice flies (6)

1958 – Frank Bolling, 9
1963 – Bubba Phillips, 10

1983 – Lance Parrish, 13
1994 – Travis Fryman, 13

2005 – Craig Monroe, 12
2014 – Miguel Cabrera, 11

Intentional walks (7)

1959 – Al Kaline, 12
1961 – Norm Cash, 19
1963 – Al Kaline, 12

1967 – Bill Freehan, 15
2010 – Miguel Cabrera, 32
2012 – Prince Fielder, 18

2014 – Víctor Martínez, 28

Grounded into double plays (8)

1943 – Jimmy Bloodworth, 29
1945 – Rudy York, 12
1955 – Bill Tuttle, 25

1968 – Mickey Stanley, 22
1976 – Rusty Staub, 23
1977 – Rusty Staub, 27

2008 – Magglio Ordóñez, 27
2012 – Miguel Cabrera, 28

At bats per strikeout (9)

1916 – Sam Crawford, 32.2
1943 – Doc Cramer, 46.6
1975 – Dan Meyer, 18.8

2002 – Randall Simon, 16.1
2006 – Plácido Polanco, 17.1
2007 – Plácido Polanco, 19.6

2008 – Plácido Polanco, 13.5
2013 – Víctor Martínez, 9.8
2014 – Víctor Martínez, 13.4

At bats per home run (9)

1909 – Ty Cobb, 63.7
1937 – Rudy York, 10.7
1938 – Hank Greenberg, 9.6

1940 – Hank Greenberg, 14.0
1946 – Hank Greenberg, 11.9
1965 – Norm Cash, 15.6

1971 – Norm Cash, 14.1
1985 – Darrell Evans, 12.6
1990 – Cecil Fielder, 11.2

Outs (16)

1908 – Germany Schaefer, 476
1911 – Donie Bush, 461
1914 – Donie Bush, 482
1931 – Roy Johnson, 471
1943 – Joe Hoover, 478
1946 – Eddie Lake, 464

1947 – Eddie Lake, 508
1953 – Harvey Kuenn, 486
1954 – Harvey Kuenn, 493
1955 – Bill Tuttle. 481
1974 – Gary Sutherland, 489
1992 – Travis Fryman, 512

1995 – Chad Curtis, 463
1997 – Brian Hunter, 525
2014 – Ian Kinsler, 528

Six-hit games (9 innings) (6)

1901 – Kid Nance
1920 – Bobby Veach

1925 – Ty Cobb
1946 – George Kell

2001 – Damion Easley
2004 – Carlos Peña

American League statistical pitching leaders

Wins (19)

1909 – George Mullin, 29
1936 – Tommy Bridges, 23
1943 – Dizzy Trout, 20
1944 – Hal Newhouser, 29
1945 – Hal Newhouser, 25
1946 – Hal Newhouser, 26
1948 – Hal Newhouser, 21

1956 – Frank Lary, 21
1957 – Jim Bunning, 20
1967 – Earl Wilson, 22
1968 – Denny McLain, 31
1969 – Denny McLain, 24
1971 – Mickey Lolich, 25
1981 – Jack Morris, 14

1991 – Bill Gullickson, 20
2009 – Justin Verlander, 19
2011 – Justin Verlander, 24
2013 – Max Scherzer, 21
2014 – Max Scherzer, 18

Win–loss Percentage (8)

1904 – Bill Donovan, .862
1909 – George Mullin, .784
1935 – Elden Auker, .720

1940 – Schoolboy Rowe, .842
1968 – Denny McLain, .838
2007 – Justin Verlander, .750

2011 – Justin Verlander, .828
2013 – Max Scherzer, .875

Earned Run Average (ERA) (9)

1902 – Ed Siever, 1.91
1944 – Dizzy Trout, 2.12
1945 – Hal Newhouser, 1.81

1946 – Hal Newhouser, 1.94
1951 – Saul Rogovin, 2.78
1962 – Hank Aguirre, 2.21

1976 – Mark Fidrych, 2.34
2011 – Justin Verlander, 2.40
2013 – Aníbal Sánchez, 2.57

Strikeouts (14)

1935 – Tommy Bridges, 163
1936 – Tommy Bridges, 175
1944 – Hal Newhouser, 187
1945 – Hal Newhouser, 212
1949 – Virgil Trucks, 153

1959 – Jim Bunning, 201
1960 – Jim Bunning, 201
1971 – Mickey Lolich, 308
1983 – Jack Morris, 232
2009 – Justin Verlander, 269

2011 – Justin Verlander, 250
2012 – Justin Verlander, 239
2014 – David Price, 271
2016 – Justin Verlander, 254

Saves (5)

1903 – George Mullin, 2
1940 – Al Benton, 17

1973 – John Hiller, 38
2000 – Todd Jones, 42

2011 – José Valverde, 49

No Hitters (8)

1912 – George Mullin
1952 – Virgil Trucks
1952 – Virgil Trucks

1958 – Jim Bunning
1984 – Jack Morris
2007 – Justin Verlander

2011 – Justin Verlander

2021 - Spencer Turnbull

Walks Plus Hits per Inning Pitched (WHIP) (6)

1933 – Firpo Marberry, 1.229
1946 – Hal Newhouser, 1.069

1949 – Fred Hutchinson, 1.161
1962 – Hank Aguirre, 1.051

2011 – Justin Verlander, .920
2013 – Max Scherzer, .970

Hits Allowed per 9 Innings Pitched (8)

1933 – Tommy Bridges, 7.416
1941 – Al Benton, 7.421
1942 – Hal Newhouser, 6.713

1945 – Hal Newhouser, 6.865
1946 – Hal Newhouser, 6.612
1962 – Hank Aguirre, 6.750

1988 – Jeff Robinson, 6.331
2011 – Justin Verlander, 6.239

Walks Allowed per 9 Innings Pitched (7)

1948 – Fred Hutchinson, 1.955
1949 – Fred Hutchinson, 2.481
1950 – Fred Hutchinson, 1.865

1951 – Fred Hutchinson, 1.290
1955 – Steve Gromek, 1.840
1961 – Don Mossi, 1.760

1977 – Dave Rozema, 1.402

Strikeouts Allowed per 9 Innings Pitched (9)

1920 – Doc Ayers, 4.442
1923 – Syl Johnson, 4.747
1942 – Hal Newhouser, 5.047

1944 – Hal Newhouser, 5.388
1945 – Hal Newhouser, 6.089
1946 – Hal Newhouser, 8.457

1960 – Jim Bunning, 7.179
2009 – Justin Verlander, 10.088
2012 – Max Scherzer, 11.078

Innings Pitched (15)

1905 – George Mullin, 347
1944 – Dizzy Trout, 352
1945 – Hal Newhouser, 313
1956 – Frank Lary, 294
1957 – Jim Bunning, 267

1958 – Frank Lary, 260
1960 – Frank Lary, 274
1968 – Denny McLain, 336
1969 – Denny McLain, 325
1971 – Mickey Lolich, 376

1983 – Jack Morris, 293
2009 – Justin Verlander, 240
2011 – Justin Verlander, 251
2012 – Justin Verlander, 238
2014 – David Price, 248

Games Started (22)

1905 – George Mullin, 41
1925 – Earl Whitehill, 33
1934 – Tommy Bridges, 35
1936 – Tommy Bridges, 38
1944 – Dizzy Trout, 40
1945 – Hal Newhouser, 36
1956 – Frank Lary, 38
1959 – Paul Foytack, 37

1960 – Frank Lary, 36
1968 – Denny McLain, 41
1969 – Denny McLain, 41
1971 – Mickey Lolich, 45
1983 – Dan Petry, 38
1990 – Jack Morris, 36
1991 – Bill Gullickson, 35
1993 – Mike Moore, 36

1994 – Tim Belcher, 25
1994 – Mike Moore, 25
2006 – Jeremy Bonderman, 34
2009 – Justin Verlander, 35
2011 – Justin Verlander, 34
2013 – Justin Verlander, 34

Complete Games (14)

1903 – Bill Donovan, 34
1905 – George Mullin, 35
1944 – Dizzy Trout, 33
1945 – Hal Newhouser, 29
1947 – Hal Newhouser, 24

1958 – Frank Lary, 19
1960 – Frank Lary, 15
1961 – Frank Lary, 22
1968 – Denny McLain, 28
1971 – Mickey Lolich, 29

1976 – Mark Fidrych, 24
1990 – Jack Morris, 11
2001 – Steve Sparks, 8
2012 – Justin Verlander, 6

Shutouts (15)

1905 – Ed Killian, 8
1926 – Ed Wells, 4
1932 – Tommy Bridges, 4
1935 – Schoolboy Rowe, 6
1943 – Dizzy Trout, 5

1944 – Dizzy Trout, 7
1945 – Hal Newhouser, 8
1949 – Virgil Trucks, 6
1950 – Art Houtteman, 4
1955 – Billy Hoeft, 7

1967 – Mickey Lolich, 6
1969 – Denny McLain, 9
1986 – Jack Morris, 6
2004 – Jeremy Bonderman, 2
2014 – Rick Porcello, 3

Walks Allowed (11)

1903 – George Mullin, 106
1904 – George Mullin, 131
1905 – George Mullin, 138
1906 – George Mullin, 108

1919 – Howard Ehmke, 107
1927 – Earl Whitehill, 105
1943 – Hal Newhouser, 111
1944 – Rufe Gentry, 108

1956 – Paul Foytack, 142
1981 – Jack Morris, 78
1994 – Mike Moore, 89

Hits Allowed (15)

1905 – George Mullin, 303
1907 – George Mullin, 346
1915 – Harry Coveleski, 271
1944 – Dizzy Trout, 314
1947 – Hal Newhouser, 268

1949 – Hal Newhouser, 277
1955 – Ned Garver, 251
1956 – Frank Lary, 289
1960 – Frank Lary, 262
1962 – Jim Bunning, 262

1969 – Denny McLain, 288
1971 – Mickey Lolich, 336
1991 – Walt Terrell, 257
2012 – Rick Porcello, 226
2014 – David Price, 230

Home Runs Allowed (23)

1910 – Sailor Stroud, 9
1931 – Earl Whitehill, 22
1935 – Tommy Bridges, 22
1946 – Virgil Trucks, 23
1948 – Fred Hutchinson, 32
1950 – Art Houtteman, 29
1953 – Ted Gray, 25
1954 – Steve Gromek, 26

1955 – Steve Gromek, 26
1959 – Jim Bunning, 37
1963 – Jim Bunning, 38
1966 – Denny McLain, 42
1967 – Denny McLain, 35
1968 – Denny McLain, 31
1972 – Mickey Lolich, 29

1974 – Mickey Lolich, 38
1983 – Dan Petry, 37
1989 – Doyle Alexander, 28
1992 – Bill Gullickson, 35
1993 – Mike Moore, 35
2003 – Mike Maroth, 34
2015 – Aníbal Sánchez, 29
2020 – Matthew Boyd, 15

Strikeout to Walk (12)

1921 – Dutch Leonard, 1.905
1934 – Schoolboy Rowe, 1.840
1935 – Schoolboy Rowe, 2.059
1947 – Fred Hutchinson, 1.852

1948 – Fred Hutchinson, 1.917
1950 – Fred Hutchinson, 1.479
1951 – Fred Hutchinson, 1.963
1954 – Billy Hoeft, 1.932

1959 – Frank Lary, 2.978
1960 – Jim Bunning, 3.141
1961 – Don Mossi, 2.915
1968 – Denny McLain, 4.444

Losses (14)

1923 – Herman Pillette, 19
1941 – Bobo Newsom, 20
1947 – Hal Newhouser, 17
1951 – Ted Gray, 14
1951 – Dizzy Trout, 14

1952 – Art Houtteman, 20
1970 – Mickey Lolich, 19
1974 – Mickey Lolich, 21
1989 – Doyle Alexander, 18
1994 – Tim Belcher, 15

1995 – Mike Moore, 15
1999 – Brian Moehler, 16
2003 – Mike Maroth, 21
2008 – Justin Verlander, 17

Earned Runs Allowed (17)

1907 – George Mullin, 103
1908 – George Mullin, 100
1910 – George Mullin, 92
1914 – Hooks Dauss, 96
1918 – Hooks Dauss, 83
1922 – Howard Ehmke, 131

1926 – Earl Whitehill, 112
1949 – Hal Newhouser, 109
1955 – Ned Garver, 102
1959 – Paul Foytack, 124
1966 – Denny McLain, 115
1970 – Mickey Lolich, 115

1974 – Mickey Lolich, 142
1990 – Jack Morris, 125
2003 – Mike Maroth, 123
2008 – Nate Robertson, 119
2014 – Justin Verlander, 104

Wild Pitches (13)

1902 – George Mullin, 13
1912 – Jean Dubuc, 16
1913 – Jean Dubuc, 13
1920 – Dutch Leonard, 13
1931 – Tommy Bridges, 9

1945 – Hal Newhouser, 10
1947 – Hal Newhouser, 11
1975 – Joe Coleman, 15
1983 – Jack Morris, 18
1984 – Jack Morris, 14

1985 – Jack Morris, 15
1987 – Jack Morris, 24
2007 – Justin Verlander, 17

Hit Batters (23)

1908 – Ed Summers, 20
1912 – Ed Willett, 17
1914 – Hooks Dauss, 18
1915 – Harry Coveleski, 20
1916 – Hooks Dauss, 16
1921 – Hooks Dauss, 13
1921 – Howard Ehmke, 13
1922 – Howard Ehmke, 23

1924 – Earl Whitehill, 13
1930 – Elon Hogsett, 9
1931 – Art Herring, 8
1933 – Tommy Bridges, 6
1954 – Steve Gromek, 12
1956 – Frank Lary, 12
1957 – Frank Lary, 12
1958 – Frank Lary, 12

1960 – Frank Lary, 19
1965 – Mickey Lolich, 12
1973 – Joe Coleman, 10
1974 – Joe Coleman, 12
1999 – Jeff Weaver, 17
2000 – Jeff Weaver, 15
2007 – Justin Verlander, 19

Batters Faced (13)

1905 – George Mullin, 1,428
1906 – George Mullin, 1,361
1944 – Dizzy Trout, 1,421
1945 – Hal Newhouser, 1,261
1956 – Frank Lary, 1,269

1968 – Denny McLain, 1,288
1969 – Denny McLain, 1,304
1971 – Mickey Lolich, 1,538
1983 – Jack Morris, 1,204
2001 – Jeff Weaver, 985

2009 – Justin Verlander, 982
2012 – Justin Verlander, 956
2014 – David Price, 1,009

Games Finished (7)

1933 – Elon Hogsett, 34
1935 – Elon Hogsett, 30
1973 – John Hiller, 60

1984 – Willie Hernández, 68
2009 – Fernando Rodney, 65
2011 – José Valverde, 70

2012 – José Valverde, 67

See also
Baseball awards
List of Major League Baseball awards

Footnotes

Award
Major League Baseball team trophies and awards